The Type 90 Ship-to-Ship Missile (90式艦対艦誘導弾, SSM-1B) is a ship-launched anti-ship missile developed by Japan's Mitsubishi Heavy Industries that entered service in 1990. It is a naval version of the truck-launched Type 88 (SSM-1) missile, which in turn was developed from the air-launched Type 80 (ASM-1) missile. The Japan Maritime Self-Defense Force bought 384 of the missiles which were fitted to their Murasame,  Takanami, Atago, Akizuki, and Asahi classes of destroyers, as well as Hayabusa-class fast-attack missile boats. But Harpoon is ditched in favor of the indigenous Type 90 starting with the 9 Murasame-class destroyers with the lead ship launched in 1994 and inducted in 1996.

See also
 Type 80 Air-to-Ship Missile
 Type 88 Surface-to-Ship Missile
 Type 93 Air-to-Ship Missile
 XASM-3

References

Anti-ship missiles of Japan
Anti-ship cruise missiles
Type 90
Military equipment introduced in the 1990s